Bhim Sharki (born 26 September 2001) is a Nepalese cricketer who plays for the Nepal national team. In March 2022, he was named in Nepal's One Day International (ODI) squad for the 2022 United Arab Emirates Tri-Nation Series. He made his ODI debut on 22 March 2022, for Nepal against Papua New Guinea. He made his Twenty20 debut on 2 May 2022, for Nepal against Zimbabwe A.

References

2001 births
Living people
Nepalese cricketers
Nepal One Day International cricketers